Mersing District is one of the 10 districts district in Johor, Malaysia. Its seat is located at Mersing Town.

Etymology
The “Mersing” name is derived from the Chinese “Mau Sheng Port” (茂盛港) since 1880 and further simplify to Mersing. Mersing's Chinese name was renamed to “Feng Sheng Port” (丰盛港), with the meaning of good harvest. There are also said that Mersing's name is derived from Sikh traders who named Amir Singh and Men Singh.

Geology
Beside the mainland area, the district also consists of 36 islands.

Geography
With an area of 2,838 km2, Mersing District is the third largest district in Johor, which covers 14.6% area of the state.

Demographics

In 2000, the annual population growth of the district was 1.21%.

Federal Parliament and State Assembly Seats 

List of Mersing district representatives in the Federal Parliament (Dewan Rakyat)

List of Mersing district representatives in the State Legislative Assembly.

Administrative divisions

Mersing District is divided into 10 mukims, which are:
 Jemaluang
 Lenggor
 Mersing Town
 Padang Endau
 Penyabong
 Offshore islands (Aur Island, Dayang Island, Rawa Island, Tengah Island, Pemanggil Island, Sibu Island)
 Sembrong
 Tenggaroh
 Tenglu
 Triang

Economy
The main economy activities in the district are ecotourism, fishery, marine activities, agriculture and light manufacturing.

Tourist attractions
 Aur Island
 Besar Island
 Harimau Island
 Mount Arong Recreational Forest
 Pemanggil Island
 Rawa Island
 Sibu Island
 Endau-Rompin National Park

Transportation
 Mersing Airport

See also
 Districts of Malaysia

References